John Nielsen (born 26 March 1946) is a Danish former footballer who played as a forward, finishing the top goalscorer of the 1971 and 1972 Danish football championships for B 1901. He played one game for the Denmark national under-21 football team. He moved abroad to play professionally for Göztepe A.Ş. and FC Bremerhaven.

External links
Danish national team profile

1946 births
Living people
Danish men's footballers
Danish expatriate men's footballers
Göztepe S.K. footballers
Süper Lig players
Expatriate footballers in Turkey
Expatriate footballers in Germany
German footballers needing infoboxes
Danish expatriate sportspeople in Turkey
Association football forwards
FC Bremerhaven players